Hon'inbō Chihaku (本因坊知伯, 1710–1733) was a Japanese professional go player, and sixth head of the Hon'inbō house.

He was a nephew of Hon'inbō Dōchi. He died young, before an official heir had been appointed.

Oshirogo

1722 against Inoue Insetsu Inseki (B with three stones, won)
1723 against Hayashi Bonkyu (B with two stones, jigo)
1725 against Hayashi Incho (B with two stones, W), against Inoue Yuseki (B, lost)
1726 against Inoue Insetsu Inseki (B, jigo)
1727 against Yasui Senkaku, (B, jigo)
1728 against Hayashi Incho, (B, won)
1730 against Inoue Shunseki (W, lost)
1731 against Inoue Shunseki, (B, won)
1733 against Inoue Shunseki (W, lost)

Sources
 GoGod Encyclopedia

1710 births
1733 deaths
Japanese Go players
Accidental deaths in Japan
18th-century Go players